Bepong is a major town in Kwahu South district, in Eastern Ghana.

References

Populated places in the Eastern Region (Ghana)